Peter Gibbs may refer to:

 Peter Gibbs (weather forecaster) (born 1958), British weather forecaster
 Peter Gibbs (cricketer) (born 1944), English cricketer and television script writer
 Peter Wyldbore Gibbs (1934–2001), Private Secretary to the British Princess Anne
 Peter Gibbs (1920–1975), English violinist and RAF pilot in No. 41 Squadron RAF. Died under inexplicable circumstances known as the Great Mull Air Mystery
 Peter Gibbs, board member of UK Financial Investments and chairman of Turquoise
 Peter Gibbs, footballer who played for Watford F.C. in 1975–1976